Forres Thistle Football Club are a football club from Forres, Morayshire, Scotland. A member of the Scottish Junior Football Association, the club play in the North Region in the North First Division. 

Founded in 1906, the club are based at Logie Park, Forres and team colours are red and white.

The club has played at Logie Park since October 14, 1990, their opening fixture was a friendly vs Dundee United where stars such as Duncan Ferguson, Mixu Paatelainen and Paul Sturrock were in attendance for a 3-0 United win.

The Ground is named Logie Park after former president Alexander 'Sandy' Logie.

The current record attendance is around 250 from a Scottish Cup second round home tie vs Pollok FC.

Management team and office bearers

The team have been managed since the beginning of the 2019–20 season by Tony Ross, assisted by Lee Davidson and Chris Ross. All 3 are former players with Forres Thistle and with Highland League experience at Lossiemouth.

The clubs President is Stevie Johnston, Vice President, Tony 'Chuck' Young, the Treasurer is James 'Suds' Sutherland and the Secretary is Dutch Holland.

Previous seasons

Season 21/22

Thistle finished a successful league campaign finishing runners up in Division 2 behind Rothie Rovers in a season where the top 2 are to be promoted.

Due to a reconstruction at the end of the year Division 1 and 2 are to be made into one single league renamed the Championship which will deny both teams a promotion

Thistle were also in the Edmundson Electrical Elginshire Cup Final which was lost 5-3 on penalties after a 2-2 draw at Logie Park where they played Division one 3rd place team Dufftown Fc.

P24 W18 D3 L 3 F71 A17 (+54) PTS 57

Top scorer Mattie Davidson 19 goals.

Biggest league win was 7–0 vs Islavale

Heaviest defeat was 0–6 vs Tayport

Scottish Cup first round defeat 0–6 vs Tayport

Season 20/21

The COVID-19 pandemic continued to cause chaos with Junior football and there was only a regionalised cup competition that was not fulfilled to its entirety.

No league games were played due to the ongoing pandemic.

Season 19/20

The Tony Ross era begins.

Thistle was enjoying a very successful league campaign in season 19/20 when the COVID-19 pandemic brought an end to their season.

Thistle were second, only a point behind Burghead but with a game in hand with two being promoted they were in a great position however it was decided that the league would be annulled.

Thistle enjoyed a record crowd vs Pollok of around 250 people at Logie Park.

P15 W12 D2 L1 F53 A18 (+35) PTS 38

Biggest win 7–1 vs Cruden Bay

Heaviest defeat 2–5 vs Downfield (Regional Cup)

Scottish Cup second round defeat 0–3 vs Pollok

Season 18/19

The regionalised Division 1 East and West was no more. Instead it was Division 1 and 2. Thistle suffered a poor season that saw them finish ninth and relegated from Division 1 to Division 2.

P24 W4 D 6 L14 F34 A56 (-22) PTS 18

Biggest win 4–1 vs Dyce

Heaviest defeat 2–6 vs Longside and Banchory

Scottish Cup second round defeat 0–3 vs Arthurlie

Season 17/18

Thistle enjoyed a successful campaign in 17/18 finishing third in the First Division West. With two going up, Deveronside pipped them at the death finishing 2 points ahead and Nairn winning the league.

P24 W16 D2 L6 F60 A32 (+28) PTS 50

Biggest win 5–0 vs Spey Valley & Whitehills

Heaviest defeat 0–8 vs Auchinleck Talbot

Scottish Cup second round defeat 0–8 vs Auchinleck Talbot

Season 16/17

Thistle were fifth in the league campaign in the First Division West

P18 W9 D 0 L9 F43 A40 (+3) PTS 27

Biggest win 6–2 vs Burghead

Heaviest defeat 0–10 vs Montrose Roselea

Scottish Cup second round defeat 1–3 vs East Kilbride Thistle.

Season 15/16

Thistle enjoyed a very successful season under former player Scotty Roy.

Finishing second in the league behind Buckie Rovers they also won the Cup double defeating Buckie Rovers on both occasions. In both Cup Finals centre half Chris Ross was sent off for two bookable offences.

P16 W10 D2 L4 F27 A15 (+12) PTS 32

Biggest win 4–0 vs Burghead

Heaviest defeat 1–8 vs Colony Park

Scottish Cup second round defeat 0–6 vs St Anthony's

Double cup fever and success

On the third of June Thistle beat Buckie Rovers 1–0 at Burghead's Forrest Park to clinch the cup double vs Buckie.

A Steven Currie solo effort was enough to clinch the Archibald Cup vs Buckie Rovers

Chris Ross was also sent off in this match for Forres who managed to hold on for the win.

https://northregion-jfa.pitchero.com/forres-thistle-win-archibald-cup-31291

Thistle won the Elginshire cup with a 5–2 win over Buckie in a cracker at Borough Briggs.

Charlie Beck who won League Player of the year scored a hat trick as Chris Ross was sent off for Forres.

https://northregion-jfa.pitchero.com/beck-hits-hat-trick-as-10-man-forres-win-elginshir-30704?external_domain=northregion-jfa.pitchero.com

Season 14/15

Thistle were once again mid table in the season.

Biggest Win 5–1 vs Buchanaven Hearts

Heaviest Defeat 0–5 vs Grantown

Scottish Cup second round defeat 2–5 vs East Craigie.

Season 13/14

Under Ian McLeods' stewardship Thistle beat Buckie Rovers 3–1 in the Elginshire Refrigeration Cup at Borough Briggs, home of Elgin City.

With a double from Matty Fraser and Mark Pennie getting one for Thistle

https://www.forres-gazette.co.uk/sport/thistle-win-the-cup-170131/

They also finished sixth in Division 1 West, Inverness City, the runaway leaders.

P27 W13 D3 L11 F51 A47 (+4)

Biggest Win 5–1 vs Fochabers

Heaviest Defeat 1–5 vs Dufftown

Scottish Cup second round defeat 2–4 vs Kennoway Stars.

Statistics

21/22 top scorers

Mattie Davidson 19

Neil Moir 15

Brandon Hutcheson 13

Charlie Beck 9

Ross Paterson 7

21/22 top appearances (36 games) 

Neil Moir 36

Dan McLeod 34

Brandon Hutcheson 33

Ross Paterson 31

Mattie Davidson 31

20/21

N/A Covid

19/20 top scorers

Matty Fraser 14

Sean McIntosh 11

Mattie Davidson 10

Ricky Wardrop 9

Brandon Hutcheson 9

19/20 top appearances (24 games)

Dan McLeod 23

Matty Fraser 22

Brandon Hutcheson 22

Scott Moore 22

Ross Montgomery 22

18/19 top scorers  

Neil Moir 12

Matty Fraser 11

Mattie Davidson 9

Brandon Hutcheson 6

Charlie Beck 5

18/19 top appearances (35 games)

Tony Ross 32

Dan McLeod 31

Sean McIntosh 30

Matty Fraser 28

Brandon Hutcheson 27

Individual honours

Club Player of the Year

21/22 TBC

20/21 N/A (covid)

19/20 Brandon Hutcheson

18/19 Neil Moir

17/18 Matty Fraser

16/17 Craig Short

15/16 Charlie Beck

14/15 Aaron McLean

13/14 Aaron McLellan

12/13 Donnie McCulloch

11/12 Charlie Beck

10/11 Chris Ross

09/10 Simon Bremner

08/09 Ross ‘Chucky’ Macpherson

07/08 Mattie Davidson

06/07 Davie Raeburn

Most improved Player of the Year superseded by Clubman of the Year 18/19 onwards

20/21 N/A Covid

19/20 N/A Covid

18/19 Lee Davidson (Clubman)

17/18 Brandon Hutcheson

16/17 Dan McLeod 

15/16 Danny Black 

14/15 Aaron Mclean 

13/14 Andrew Taylor 

12/13 Craig Daley

11/12 John Ross

10/11 Alan Angus

09/10 Lee Davidson

08/09 Matthew Milne 

07/08 Sean Cooke

06/07 Barry Stables 

05/06 Simon Bremner 

04/05 Gordon Stepien

League Player of the Year

15/16 Charlie Beck

Top apps since 18/19    

Dan McLeod 88    

Brandon Hutcheson 82    

Neil Moir 78    

Matty Fraser 78    

Mattie Davidson 74    

Sean McIntosh 74    

Matty Milne 68    

Charlie Beck 61    

Danny Black 55    

Aaron McLellan 53

Top scorers since 18/19    

Mattie Davidson 38    

Neil Moir 35    

Matty Fraser 32    

Brandon Hutcheson 28    

Sean McIntosh 20    

Charlie Beck 15

Honours
North Region First Division (West) winners: 2002–03
North Regional (North) League winners: 1971–72, 1979–80
Morayshire Junior League winners: 1926–27, 1929–30
Gordon Williamson Trophy: 1966–67, 1967–68, 2002–03, 2004–05
Morayshire Junior Cup: 1925–26, 1930–31, 1953–54, 1970–71, 1973–74, 1977–78, 1991–92, 1999–00
Nicholson Cup: 1926–27, 1972–73
North Drybrough Cup: 1972–73
North of Scotland (Morayshire) Cup: 1952–53, 1957–58, 1958–59, 1968–69, 1973–74, 1974–75, 1975–76, 1978–79, 1984–85, 1985–86
Robbie Nicol Cup: 1992–93, 2000–01
Robertson Cup: 1930–31, 1959–60, 1960–61, 1967–68, 1968–69, 1970–71, 1971–72, 1988–89
Stewart Memorial Cup: 1971–72, 1999–00
Connon Cup: 1952–53, 1953–54, 1957–58, 1979–80, 1984–85, 1999–00
White Horse Cup: 1929–30, 1935–36, 1936–37, 1952–53, 1968–69, 1970–71, 1976–77
Elginshire Cup: 2013–14, 2015–16
Archibald Cup: 2015–16

References

Sources
Non-league Scotland

Football clubs in Scotland
Football in Moray
Scottish Junior Football Association clubs
Association football clubs established in 1906
1906 establishments in Scotland
Forres